Louisiana gained two seats in reapportionment following the 1820 United States Census. Louisiana elected its members July 1–3, 1822.

See also 
 1822 and 1823 United States House of Representatives elections
 List of United States representatives from Louisiana

Notes 

1822
Louisiana
United States House of Representatives